Thomas Wedge (1760–1854) was an English agriculturalist. He was the son of Francis Wedge (1714–1784) of Fernhill House, near Forton, Staffordshire, a prosperous farmer, and brother of John Wedge and Charles Wedge of Shudy Camps. Thomas Wedge established himself on farms near Sealand, Flintshire where he prospered on the land.

In 1794 he wrote A General View of the Agriculture of the County Palatine of Chester (London, 1794) for the Board of Agriculture and Internal Improvement. Thomas Wedge married Susannah Couchman of Balsall Temple, Warwickshire, the daughter of Henry Couchman the noted architect and landscape designer, but they had no children.

At the end of his life Thomas Wedge paid for and endowed the Thomas Wedge Church of England Primary School in Saughall, which existed until the early 21st century. Thomas Wedge School was extended in 2005, but its closure is planned for July 2009; a replacement school will be given a new name. He died in 1854 aged 94.

1760 births
People from Forton, Staffordshire
18th-century English farmers
1854 deaths
19th-century English farmers